Ramabhadrapuram mandal is one of the 34 mandals in Vizianagaram district of Andhra Pradesh, India. Ramabhadrapuram is the headquarters of the mandal. The mandal is bounded by Salur, Bobbili, Badangi, Merakamudidam, Dattirajeru, Mentada and Pachipenta mandals.

Demographics 

 census, the mandal had a population of 47,723. The total population constitute, 23,666 males and 24,057 females. The entire population is rural in nature.

Government and politics 

Ramabhadrapuram mandal is one of the four mandals in Bobbili (Assembly constituency), which in turn is a part of Vizianagaram (Lok Sabha constituency), one of the 25 Lok Sabha constituencies representing Andhra Pradesh. The present MLA is Venkata Sujay Krishna Ranga Rao Ravu, who won the Andhra Pradesh Legislative Assembly election, 2014 representing Yuvajana Sramika Rythu Congress Party.

Rural villages
 2011 census of India, the mandal has 31 settlements, consisting of 31 villages. Ramabhadrapuram is the most populated and Mulachelagam is the least populated village in the mandal.

The settlements in the mandal are listed below:

References 

Mandals in Vizianagaram district